Michael Mak Kwok-fung (born 23 August 1955 in Hong Kong) is a Hong Kong politician. He is an elected representative of the Wan Chai District. He was the founding deputy chairman of the League of Social Democrats, and was elected to the Advisory Council of the party in 2010. He is a registered mental nurse, was elected into the Legislative Council of Hong Kong from 2000 to 2004 through the health services functional constituency. He worked with Castle Peak Hospital and Prince of Wales Hospital, and retired from the post of Department Operations Manager at Kwai Chung Hospital in September 2015.

In 2008, Mak was denied entry to Macau to attend a meeting on nursing when the Olympic torch relay was being held in there.

References

External links
Blog of Michael Mak

1955 births
Living people
Hong Kong nurses
District councillors of Wan Chai District
League of Social Democrats politicians
HK LegCo Members 2000–2004